This is an episode guide for the British television series Mr. Bean, starring Rowan Atkinson as the title character, which ran between 1 January 1990 and 15 December 1995. Also listed are other live and guest appearances of Mr. Bean in television broadcasts, a number of short sketches for Comic Relief and various commercials, music videos and YouTube videos.

Episodes

Films

Other appearances

Unaired sketches
These short and standalone sketches are included on some video releases:

Deleted scenes 
The following scenes from episodes 7 and 9 are not seen in the original broadcasts of their respective episodes, but were included in the American broadcasts on HBO. They were likely added to the HBO broadcast to lengthen the running time. These scenes are also seen on some early VHS releases of the show in the United States.

Remake sketches
In November 1991, it was announced 20th Century Fox had a feature film adaptation of Mr. Bean in development. They remade two Mr. Bean sketches into short films: Mr. Bean Takes an Exam and Mr. Bean Goes to a Première and attached them to their theatrical releases.

YouTube sketches

Comic Relief 
A number of short sketches featuring Bean have also been produced for the Comic Relief telethon. The first three were included on a VHS release entitled "Comic Relief – Pick of the Nose", released in 1997 on BBC Video. "Mr. Bean's Wedding" was released on the DVD release "Mr. Bean – The Complete Collection".

Music videos

Commercials

Guest appearances 
Rowan Atkinson has also appeared in character as Mr. Bean in many normally factual television broadcasts, sometimes as a publicity stunt to promote a new episode,VHS, DVD or film.

Handy Bean

20 videos (4 to 7 minutes each) under the series name "Handy Bean" were released on YouTube between 2018 and 2020. These videos show Mr. Bean's hands doing different activities. They use stock sound and video from earlier Mr. Bean footage, with a younger actor providing the hands of Mr. Bean.

References

External links 
 
 episode list

Mr. Bean episodes, List of
Mr. Bean